Several countries have or have had a Mediterranean fleet in their navy:

 Mediterranean Fleet, formerly of the British Royal Navy
 French Mediterranean Fleet
 Mediterranean Squadron (United States)
 United States Sixth Fleet
 Mediterranean Division, a detached unit of the Imperial German Navy
 5th Operational Squadron, an element of the Soviet Navy
 Permanent task force of the Russian Navy in the Mediterranean Sea
 Mediterranean Fleet (Russian Empire)